Morenica is an album by pianist Anthony Coleman's Sephardic Tinge which was released on the Tzadik label in 1998.

Reception

In his review for Allmusic, David Freedlander states "this album further establishes Coleman as one of Downtown's most accomplished pianists and intelligent composers".

Track listing
All compositions by Anthony Coleman except as indicated
 "La Cantiga Fuego" (Traditional) - 3:55   
 "She's Doing It Again" - 2:43   
 "He Would Turn in His Grave" - 5:14   
 "Yaëlica" - 7:41   
 "Addio Querida" (Traditional) - 6:03   
 "Ghetto (Ich Bin Ein Marrano)" - 2:30   
 "Terpsichore" (Herbie Nichols) - 5:29   
 "Selo Moje" - 3:41   
 "Berechit" - 4:21   
 "Morenica" (Traditional) - 6:47

Personnel
Anthony Coleman - piano, voice
Ben Street - bass 
Michael Sarin - drums

References

Tzadik Records albums
Anthony Coleman albums
1998 albums